Vyšehrad Proclamation was introduced by the Civic Democratic Party (ODS) on 17 August 2017. It consisted of 17 conditions for the party to be a part of government coalition after 2017 legislative election.

Party's leader Petr Fiala stated that the Declaration doesn't mean that ODS will be in opposition after the election but that it has its condition to participate in the government. Fiala also stated that Proclamation gives a space for negotiations.

Conditions 
All 12 conditions in the Proclamation.

1) Increasing of net wages and lowering taxes.
2) Significant reduction of social security contributions for employers
3) Raising the limit of flat rate payments for traders at least twice.
4) The government's commitment not to raise taxes for businesses throughout the election period.
5) Introduction of a simple and uniform tax return, social and health insurance.
6) Cancellation of the electronic revenue records and the introduction of a flat-rate tax for non-payers of VAT - the principle of "pay and start without further checks" for the smallest entrepreneurs.
7) Audit of bureaucratic burdens and the legal system in key areas within six months of the government's inception, and a radical reduction in the number of regulations, laws, and decrees in the first and second year of government.
8) Implementation of the "Everything in One Door" system to handle all common issues for citizens from 1 January 2019.
9) Significant cuts in national subsidies to private firms and significant cuts in investment incentives.
10) Education becomes the financial and political priority of the government.
11) The government is preparing a confident position in the EU and a strategy to promote EU reforms based on national interests and national consensus. The government's program will include the refusal of mandatory refugee quotas and the mandatory adoption of the euro.
12) The government will not allow to question the Euro-Atlantic orientation of the Czech Republic, will increase its spending on security, assume a gradual increase in defense spending to 2 percent of GDP over six years.

After election
ODS received 11% of votes and became the second strongest party. Alexandra Udženija stated that ODS will not abandon Vyšehrad Proclamation. Petr Fiala stated that ODS will not participate in the government led by ANO 2011. fiala also started negotiations with other opposition parties about possible cooperation.

References

2017 in the Czech Republic
Civic Democratic Party (Czech Republic)
Political history of the Czech Republic